The Lima leaf-eared mouse (Phyllotis limatus) or Lima pericote is a species of rodent in the family Cricetidae. It is found in a variety of habitats on the western slopes of the Andes from northern Chile to west-central Peru at elevations from sea level to 4000 m.

References

Mammals of Chile
Mammals of Peru
Phyllotis
Mammals described in 1912
Taxa named by Oldfield Thomas